Smotrych is an urban-type settlement in Kamianets-Podilskyi Raion (district) of Khmelnytskyi Oblast in western Ukraine. Smotrych hosts the administration of Smotrych settlement hromada, one of the hromadas of Ukraine. Its Jewish population was murdered en masse during the Holocaust.

The settlement was first founded in the first half of the 15th century. It was granted the Magdeburg rights in 1448. In 1960, Smotrych was granted the status of an urban-type settlement. The town lies on the banks of the Smotrych River.

Until 18 July 2020, Smotrych belonged to Dunaivtsi Raion. The raion was abolished in July 2020 as part of the administrative reform of Ukraine, which reduced the number of raions of Khmelnytskyi Oblast to three. The area of Dunaivtsi Raion was merged into Kamianets-Podilskyi Raion.

People from Smotrych
 Meletius Smotrytsky (1577-1633), religious and pedagogical activist of the Polish–Lithuanian Commonwealth, Ruthenian linguist
 Bezalel Smotrich's (1980-) Israeli government minister. His ancestors are from the village

See also
 Dunaivtsi, the other urban-type settlement in Dunaivtsi Raion

References

Urban-type settlements in Kamianets-Podilskyi Raion
Podolia Voivodeship
Podolia Governorate
Populated places established in the 1440s